Erato edentula is a species of small sea snail, a marine gastropod mollusc in the family Triviidae, the false cowries or trivias.

Description

Distribution

References

Triviidae
Gastropods described in 2009